Estádio Alberto Víctolo  is a multi-use stadium located in Tanabi, Brazil. It is used mostly for football matches and hosts the home matches of Tanabi Esporte Clube. The stadium has a maximum capacity of 11,617 people.

External links
Templos do Futebol

Alberto Victolo
Sports venues in São Paulo (state)